Wishful Thinking is a 1997 romantic comedy film directed by Adam Park and starring Jennifer Beals, Drew Barrymore, Jon Stewart and James LeGros.

Plot synopsis
Veterinarian Elizabeth questions the relationship, after her projectionist boyfriend Max declines the marriage. Max's beautiful co-worker, Lena who is in love with him, takes advantage of his romantic troubles and wants to have him for herself, playing on his fear that Elizabeth is having an affair with her friend Jack. Depressed by Max's increasing jealousy, Elizabeth considers breaking up with him after she meets Henry.

Cast
Jennifer Beals as Elizabeth
James LeGros as Max
Drew Barrymore as Lena
Eric Thal as Jack
Jon Stewart as Henry
Desiree Casado as Donita

References

External links

1997 films
1997 romantic comedy films
American romantic comedy films
1990s English-language films
1990s American films